Antonieta Sosa (born 1940) is a Venezuelan performance artist born in New York. Her notable performance works include Conversación con agua tibia (Conversation with Warm Water; 1980) and Del Cuerpo al Vacío (From the Body into the Void; 1985). Her early work includes abstract art pieces such as Visual Chess (1965), which is in the Museum of Modern Art's online collection.

References

1940 births
Living people
Artists from New York (state)
American emigrants to Venezuela